Abstract: The Art of Design is a Netflix original documentary series highlighting artists in the field of design. It was released on Netflix on February 10, 2017. The series was created by former Wired editor-in-chief Scott Dadich.

The first season profiled illustrator Christoph Niemann, Nike shoe designer Tinker Hatfield, stage designer Es Devlin, architect Bjarke Ingels, automotive designer Ralph Gilles, graphic designer Paula Scher, photographer Platon, and interior designer Ilse Crawford.

In 2019, Netflix announced that the series had been renewed for a second season, which was released on September 25, 2019.

Episodes

Season 1 (2017)

Season 2 (2019)

References

External links
 Abstract: The Art of Design on Netflix

Netflix original documentary television series
2010s American documentary television series
English-language Netflix original programming